Măureni (also Morițfeld;) is a commune in Caraș-Severin County, western Romania with a population of 2,579 people. It is composed of two villages, Măureni and Șoșdea (Sósd).

At the 2011 census, 97.3% of inhabitants were Romanians, 1.3% Hungarians and 1% Germans.

Natives
 Augustin Pacha

References

Communes in Caraș-Severin County
Localities in Romanian Banat